Carlos Patricio Mac Allister (born 20 March 1966) is an Argentine former professional footballer who played as a forward for clubs in Argentina, Mexico and Japan.

Career
Born in Santa Rosa, La Pampa, Mac Allister began playing football with local side General Belgrano de Santa Rosa. He made his Primera debut with Estudiantes de la Plata in 1989. He also played in the first team of Argentinos Juniors.

Mac Allister had a spell in Mexico with Correcaminos UAT and then moved to Japan to play for Mitsubishi Motors.

Post-playing career
In 1998, the Mac Allister brothers, Carlos Javier and Carlos Patricio, decided to found their own sports club for youngsters, the MacAllister Sports Club. They acquired a four-hectare piece of land situated 5 km away from the centre of the city of Santa Rosa, La Pampa, where they built their own club to instruct and promote soccer players for their subsequent insertion into professional soccer. Patricio Mac Allister served as coach of the club's youth teams since 1999, and has also coached for General Belgrano de Santa Rosa and the youth teams of Argentinos Juniors.

Personal life
Mac Allister is the older brother of former professional footballer Carlos Mac Allister, and he has three nephews who are also professional footballers: Alexis, Francis and Kevin. Mac Allister is of Irish and Italian descent. Although assumed to be of Scottish heritage, Mac Allister's family origins were instead from the Irish town of Donabate.

References

External links

CV at ClubMacAllister.com.ar

1966 births
Living people
People from Santa Rosa, La Pampa
Argentine people of Scottish descent
Argentine people of Irish descent
Argentine footballers
Association football forwards
Argentine Primera División players
Liga MX players
Textil Mandiyú footballers
Estudiantes de La Plata footballers
Argentinos Juniors footballers
Aldosivi footballers
Correcaminos UAT footballers
Argentine expatriate footballers
Argentine expatriate sportspeople in Mexico
Expatriate footballers in Mexico
Argentine expatriate sportspeople in Japan
Expatriate footballers in Japan
Patricio